Netechma lamanana is a species of moth of the family Tortricidae. It is found in Cotopaxi Province, Ecuador.

The wingspan is 25 mm. The ground colour of the forewings is pale brownish with browner suffusions and strigulation (fine steaks). The hindwings are whitish, slightly tinged with brownish at the apex.

Etymology
The species name refers to the type locality of La Maná.

References

Moths described in 2008
Netechma